Ryan is a town in Jefferson County, Oklahoma, United States, located north of the Texas state line. The population was 816 at the 2010 census, a decline of over 8.7 percent from the figure of 894 in 2000.

Geography
Ryan is located at  (34.021679, -97.954300).

History
The incorporated community of Ryan is located in southwestern Jefferson County. It was named in honor of rancher Stephen W. Ryan, an Arkansas native who settled near present-day Ryan in 1875.

As a result of his marriage to a Chickasaw woman, Ryan acquired vast acreage in present Jefferson County, then a part of Pickens County, Chickasaw Nation, Indian Territory. When the Chicago, Rock Island and Pacific Railway constructed a station on Ryan's land in 1892, he platted the site for the town that now bears his name. A post office had been established in that locality in June 1890, and Ryan's home, built circa 1877, was the community's first residence.

Ryan was named the seat of Jefferson County by delegates to the 1906 Constitutional Convention. It lost that title in February 1912, when county voters chose Waurika to be the county seat. Ryan developed as an agricultural and ranching community. Local ranchers raised cattle and hogs, and farmers produced cotton, corn, and wheat. The fruit industry was a prosperous enterprise, as pears, peaches, apples, plums, and strawberries were grown in abundance.

Fire nearly destroyed Ryan in December 1895, but the residents rebuilt. Ryan had 1,115 residents in 1907. By 1908, it had thirty businesses, including two banks, a hotel, a cotton gin, two lumberyards, a flour mill, and a cottonseed oil mill. By 1930 the townspeople enjoyed  of paved roads, two schools, three hundred telephone connections, and a bus line. The town's population peaked at 1,379 in 1920 and then declined. The 1940 and 1950 censuses reported 1,115 and 1,019, respectively. Numbers dropped to 978 in 1960. By 1980 the town had 1,083 residents, declining to 894 in 2000.

At the start of the twenty-first century, Ryan had four Protestant churches and one Catholic church. Two primary and secondary schools were available to the public. The Ryan public schools and the Ryan Nursing Home were the town's major employers. The Ryan Nursing home, however, closed in 2011. The weekly Ryan Leader, the community's lone newspaper in 2003, began as the Ryan Record in 1894.

Demographics

As of the census of 2000, there were 894 people, 358 households, and 233 families residing in the town. There were 439 housing units at an average density of 484.9 per square mile (186.3/km2). The racial makeup of the town was 87.47% White, 0.67% African American, 3.24% Native American, 0.22% Asian, 0.00% Pacific Islander, 6.82% from other races, and 1.57% from two or more races. 12.30% of the population were Hispanic or Latino of any race.

There were 358 households, out of which 31.0% had children under the age of 18 living with them, 50.6% were married couples living together, 10.6% had a female householder with no husband present, and 34.9% were non-families. 31.0% of all households were made up of individuals, and 17.3% had someone living alone who was 65 years of age or older. The average household size was 2.35 and the average family size was 2.97.

In the town the population was spread out, with 24.7% under the age of 18, 6.9% from 18 to 24, 24.0% from 25 to 44, 21.4% from 45 to 64, and 22.9% who were 65 years of age or older. The median age was 42 years. For every 100 females, there were 83.6 males. For every 100 females age 18 and over, there were 78.5 males.

The median income for a household in the town was $20,855, and the median income for a family was $26,167. Males had a median income of $22,813 versus $15,000 for females. The per capita income for the town was $11,057. About 26.7% of families and 25.4% of the population were below the poverty line, including 32.3% of those under age 18 and 12.9% of those age 65 or over.

Education
Ryan Public Schools operates public schools.

Notable people
Chuck Norris, martial artist and actor
Abe Lemons, college basketball coach
 Floyd Tillman, singer in Country Music Hall of Fame

References

Towns in Jefferson County, Oklahoma
Towns in Oklahoma
Populated places established in 1890